Lycoperdon molle, commonly known as the smooth puffball or the soft puffball, is a type of puffball mushroom in the genus Lycoperdon. It was first described scientifically in 1799 by Dutch mycologist Christiaan Hendrik Persoon. The puffball is edible when the internal flesh is still white.

References

External links

Edible fungi
Fungi described in 1801
Fungi of Europe
Fungi of North America
Taxa named by Christiaan Hendrik Persoon
molle